The Fabulous Impressions is an album by the American soul music group the Impressions, released in 1967. It includes a cover of the Gene McDaniels song "One Hundred Pounds of Clay".

Track listing
All tracks composed by Curtis Mayfield; except where indicated
 "You Always Hurt Me" – 2:16 
 "It's All Over" – 3:11 
 "Little Girl" – 2:30 
 "One Hundred Pounds of Clay" (Luther Dixon, Bob Elgin, Kay Rogers) – 2:22 
 "Love's a Comin'" – 2:30 
 "You Ought to Be in Heaven" – 2:46 
 "I Can't Stay Away from You" – 2:46 
 "Aware of Love" (Jerry Butler, Mayfield) – 2:31 
 "Isle of the Sirens" – 3:02 
 "I'm Still Waitin'" – 3:00 
 "She Don't Love Me" – 2:43

Personnel
 Curtis Mayfield – lead vocals, guitar
 Fred Cash – backing vocals
 Sam Gooden – backing vocals
 The Funk Brothers – instrumentation
 Johnny Pate – producer

Charts

References

1967 albums
The Impressions albums
Albums produced by Johnny Pate
ABC Records albums